Nicolas Mathieu (164? – 30 March 1706, in Paris) was a noted music collector and a Catholic priest of the Église Saint-André-des-Arts in Paris from 1681 until his death. He amassed one of the largest collections of Italian music of the 16th and 17th century outside of Italy. His library was utilized by many noted French musicians both during his lifetime and after his death. Mathieu bequeathed his music collection to composer Michel Richard Delalande upon his death.

Sources 
 Denise Launay, La musique religieuse en France du Concile de Trente à 1804, Société française de Musicologie et Éditions Klincksieck, Paris 1993, 583p.

1706 deaths
Collectors from Paris
French patrons of music
1640s births
17th-century philanthropists